NCAA College Football 2K2: Road to the Rose Bowl, also known as simply NCAA College Football 2K2, is an American football video game developed by Visual Concepts in association with Sega. It was released in 2001 for only the Sega Dreamcast. The cover athlete is former Purdue standout quarterback Drew Brees.

The game was the first of two college football games developed by Visual Concepts, the second being NCAA College Football 2K3. The game features season mode, hopefully leading up to the Rose Bowl, and Legacy Mode, where the player can follow their team for a few years. It also features online play and customizable plays, players, and teams. The Sugar, Orange, and Fiesta bowls aren't licensed although all other bowls represented are.

The game and the rest of the 2K titles on the Dreamcast have had their online components revived and are completely playable online.

Reception

The game received "generally favorable reviews" according to the review aggregation website Metacritic.

References

External links
 

2001 video games
College football video games
Dreamcast games
Dreamcast-only games
NCAA video games
North America-exclusive video games
Sega video games
Video games developed in the United States
Multiplayer and single-player video games